Vestmanna is a town in the Faroe Islands on the west of the island of Streymoy.

It was formerly a ferry port, until an undersea tunnel, the Vágatunnilin, was built from Vágar to Kvívík and Stykkið further south on Streymoy. The cliffs west of Vestmanna, Vestmannabjørgini, are very popular for excursions by boat.

A 'Vestmann' was a "Westman", or Gael in Old Norse. The original name was Vestmannahavn, i.e. "Westmen's/Irishmen's harbour".

History
In December 1759, during the Seven Years' War, François Thurot's squadron sheltered from stormy conditions at Vestmanna. The lack of supplies available from the islanders motivated the subsequent raids by the squadron on the north Irish coast.

Geography
It is surrounded by the mountains of Hægstafjall, Økslin, Loysingafjall, and Moskurfjall.

Tourism
Vestmanna is often called the tourist village of the Faroe Islands. The main tourist attraction is Vestmannabjørgini.
In 2012, a camping site was established at Inni á Fjørð with a capacity of 120 caravans in addition to tents.

Photos from Vestmannabjørgini and Vestmanna

See also
 List of towns in the Faroe Islands

References

External links 

 Vestmanna.fo, Municipality of Vestmanna
 Sightseeing.fo
 Puffin.fo
 Visit-vestmanna.com

Populated places in the Faroe Islands
Populated coastal places in the Faroe Islands
Ports and harbours of the Faroe Islands
Municipalities of the Faroe Islands
Streymoy